The USCG Air Station Bermuda provided air-sea rescue services from Bermuda. It was operated by the United States Coast Guard detachment on Bermuda.

It moved from the Naval Air Station Bermuda to Kindley Air Force Base in November 1963. It remained there until the withdrawal of its HU-16 Grumman Albatross flying boats in 1965. Their role was subsequently filled by helicopters.

References

Defunct military airports in Bermuda
Bermuda
Buildings and structures in Bermuda